Barker Range is a mountain range trending northwest–southeast and including Jato Nunatak, Mount Watt, Mount McCarthy, and Mount Burton, located at the southwest side of Millen Range in the Victory Mountains, Victoria Land. It was named by the New Zealand Antarctic Place-Names Committee for James Barker, leader at Scott Base, 1972.

See also
Icefall Nunatak (Victoria Land)

References
 

Mountain ranges of Victoria Land
Borchgrevink Coast